Catherine Ann Corman (born 1975) is an American photographer and filmmaker.

Her short film Lost Horizon, based on the work of Nobel Laureate Patrick Modiano, was invited to the Cannes Film Festival and long-listed for the Academy Awards. Her short film Les Non-Dupes screened at the Berlin Biennale. Her book of photographs, Daylight Noir: Raymond Chandler's Imagined City, was exhibited at the Venice Biennale and is included in the collection of the Museum of Modern Art Library. Her book Photographs of the Saints was honored at Paris Photo. Romanticism, her book of collage poems and photographs, was nominated for a Pushcart Prize. She is also the editor of Joseph Cornell’s Dreams.

Her work has appeared in The Times Literary Supplement and Vogue Italia, and on the websites of The New Yorker, The Paris Review and The Economist.

Educated at Harvard and Oxford Universities, she lives in New York City. 
She is the daughter of film director Roger Corman, and appears in his film Frankenstein Unbound playing the role of Justine.

References

External links

 

Living people
American essayists
American filmmakers
American photographers
American women photographers
Artists from Los Angeles
1975 births
21st-century American women